This is a complete list of the operas and operettas of the Austro-Hungarian composer Franz Lehár (1870–1948).


List of operas and operettas

References
Lamb, Andrew (1992), "Lehár, Franz" in The New Grove Dictionary of Opera, ed. Stanley Sadie (London) 
Operone list of Lehár's works, accessed 15 May 2009
The stage works of Franz Lehàr – The Guide to Musical Theatre

External links

Lists of operas by composer
 
Lists of compositions by composer